Ronchi Valsugana (I Rónchi in local dialect) is a comune (municipality) in Trentino in the northern Italian region Trentino-Alto Adige/Südtirol, located about  east of Trento.

Ronchi Valsugana borders the following municipalities: Torcegno, Roncegno and Borgo Valsugana.

Demographic evolution

References

Cities and towns in Trentino-Alto Adige/Südtirol